Butler Canyon is a valley in the U.S. state of Arizona.

Butler Canyon has the name of Jacob Noah Butler, a Mormon pioneer.

References

Landforms of Apache County, Arizona
Valleys of Arizona